The Wonders of His Love is the second studio album by Philip Bailey released in 1984 on  Myrrh Records. This was his first gospel album peaking at No. 13 on the Billboard Top Christian Albums chart and No. 17 on the Billboard Top Gospel Albums chart.

Critical reception

The Wonders of His Love was Grammy nominated in the category of Best  Inspirational Performance.

Track listing

Personnel

Musicians 
 Philip Bailey – lead and backing vocals
 Alan Pasqua – synthesizers (1, 5, 7, 9)
 Skip Scarborough – keyboards (1, 7)
 Jerry Peters – horn arrangements (1, 6, 9), string arrangements (1, 6, 7, 9), keyboards (3, 4), organ (3, 4), synthesizers (4)
 George Duke – keyboards (2, 8), synthesizers (2)
 Leonard Caston – backing vocals (3, 5), keyboards (5), synthesizer arrangements (5)
 Charles Williams – keyboards (6, 9)
 Paul Jackson Jr. – guitars (1, 3-8)
 Dann Huff – guitars (2)
 James Jamerson, Jr. – bass (1, 2, 3, 5, 7, 9)
 Freddie Washington – bass (4, 6)
 Abraham Laboriel – bass (8)
 Gerry Brown – drums
 Paulinho da Costa – percussion (1, 2, 6, 8)
 Ralph Johnson – percussion (3, 7)
 Don Myrick – saxophone (1)
 Andrew Woolfolk – saxophone (2)
 Rahmlee Michael Davis – trumpet (8)
 Charles Veal Jr. – concertmaster (1, 6, 7, 9)
 Carl Carwell –  backing vocals (1-7, 9)
 Jeanette Hawes – backing vocals (1-7, 9), lead vocals (3)
 Carolyn Caston – backing vocals (3, 5)
 Margaret Briggs – backing vocals (4, 6)
 Gwen Brown – backing vocals (4, 6, 9)
 Julia Tillman – backing vocals (4, 6, 9)
 Greg Walker – backing vocals (4, 6, 9)
 Winston Ford – backing vocals (7)
 Teri DeSario – lead and backing vocals (8)

Production 
 Producer – Philip Bailey
 Recording Engineer – Jack Joseph Puig
 Second Engineers – Steven Ford, Ross Palone and David Schober.
 Recorded at Bill Schnee Studio, Mama Jo's Recording Studio and Hollywood Sound Recorders (Hollywood, CA).
 Mixed by Ross Palone at Hollywood Sound Recorders, assisted by Mike Wuellner.
 Mastered by Doug Sax at The Mastering Lab (Los Angeles, CA).
 Liner Notes – Julius West

Charts

References

1984 albums
Philip Bailey albums